Dizalu (also Romanized as Dīzalū; also known as Ādīzlū, Dīzā, and Diziloo) is a village in Olya Rural District, in the Central District of Ardestan County, Isfahan Province, Iran. At the 2006 census, its population was 123, in 27 families.

References 

Populated places in Ardestan County